Chen Yu (born 8 May 1980) is a former Chinese badminton player from Nanning, Guangxi.

Career
Chen had joined the Guangxi team in 1993, and was selected to join the national team in 1998. Chen won the men's singles title at the Chinese National Championships in 2002 and 2003. On the international badminton circuit he won the 2006 Thailand Open by defeating two fellow countrymen (and two fellow "Chens"), Chen Hong in the semifinals, and Chen Jin in a very close final. Outside of that victory he has had trouble breaking through, but has been runner-up in the Denmark (2003, 2006), Singapore (2003, 2007), and German Opens (2007), and at the prestigious All-England Championships in 2007. He was also part of the national men's team that won the 2001 Asia Cup, and at the Thomas Cup in 2004 and 2008. Chen Yu received an award during a ceremony to mark his retirement with five other teammates from the Chinese national badminton team on the sidelines of the China Open badminton event in Shanghai, November 23, 2008. The then 27-year-old veteran would become a coach of the national Chinese men's team.

Achievements

World Championships 
Men's singles

World Cup 
Men's singles

Asian Championships 
Men's singles

World Junior Championships 
Boys' singles

Asian Junior Championships 
Boys' doubles

Mixed doubles

BWF Superseries  
The BWF Superseries, launched on 14 December 2006 and implemented in 2007, is a series of elite badminton tournaments, sanctioned by Badminton World Federation (BWF). BWF Superseries has two level such as Superseries and Superseries Premier. A season of Superseries features twelve tournaments around the world, which introduced since 2011, with successful players invited to the Superseries Finals held at the year end.

Men's singles

 BWF Superseries Finals tournament
 BWF Superseries Premier tournament
 BWF Superseries tournament

BWF Grand Prix
The BWF Grand Prix has two levels: Grand Prix and Grand Prix Gold. It is a series of badminton tournaments, sanctioned by Badminton World Federation (BWF) since 2007. The World Badminton Grand Prix sanctioned by International Badminton Federation (IBF) since 1983.

Men's singles

References

External links
 
 
 

1980 births
Living people
People from Nanning
Badminton players from Guangxi
Chinese male badminton players